Rui Chenggang (born September 24, 1977) was a Chinese news anchor and journalist for China's state-run broadcaster China Central Television. He was well known for his "unabashedly nationalistic" style when hosting economy and finance related shows with wide viewership on the channel CCTV-2. He was detained for investigation by Chinese prosecution organs in July 2014, accused of corruption.

Career

Rui was born in Hefei, Anhui in 1977. He went to No. 8 Middle School in Hefei, and was the president of the student council. In 1995 during Gaokao exams, Rui ranked first among social science and humanities students in his city, and ranked fourth in his province. He was admitted to China Foreign Affairs University in 1995, where he studied international trade and global economics. He represented China at the 1998 International Public Speaking Competition.

In 2000, Rui began working for CCTV-9, the state broadcaster's English language channel. Rui took part in the World Economic Forum in Davos, Switzerland, in 2001, and was named one of the "Global Leaders of Tomorrow". In 2005, Rui was named a Yale World Fellow.

In 2007, he criticized in his blog the presence of a Starbucks shop at the Forbidden City, generating significant popular support. Eventually the U.S. brand removed its store from the historic site. Rui said the Starbucks invaded a site of Chinese historical heritage and argued against the "globalization" of historical sites.

In 2008, Rui left CCTV-9 for CCTV-2, a channel focusing on business and economics. At CCTV-2 he was known for being the host for programs such as Economics Half Hour, Economic News, Global Economic Connection. He was also involved in the preparation of a television series focused on China during the year of the Olympics. He also hosted a program discussing the global financial crisis. As part of his work with CCTV, he has interviewed prominent global personalities such as Bill Gates, Tony Blair, Yasuo Fukuda, and Bill Clinton.

At the 2011 G20 Cannes summit, Rui attracted controversy for ignoring pre-determined protocol during a press conference, as U.S. President Barack Obama said he would give the final question at a press conference in Seoul to South Korean media, but Rui interrupted saying "I'm actually Chinese, but I think I get to represent the entire Asia". At an economic forum, Rui asked the then-U.S. ambassador to China Gary Locke, "My colleagues told me you flew economy class here – was that a reminder that the U.S. still owes China money?"

By 2014, Rui had gathered millions of followers on various social media sites and was considered a 'star anchor' for CCTV. His fluent English speaking abilities made him a symbol of the "globalization of the economics channel of CCTV". He was also criticized by many detractors for his arrogant and aggressive style, as he was reportedly "used to the rock star lifestyle" and "has a taste for sharp [Zegna] suits and fast cars [reportedly a Jaguar]".

Arrest and disappearance
Rui was placed under investigation by Chinese prosecution authorities on July 11, 2014. The abrupt sequence of events shocked television viewers and garnered a quick and overwhelming response on social media. Apart from sporadic media reports speculating on his whereabouts, it is not clear what happened to Rui after 2014, until he was sentenced to six years in prison in 2016 for alleged corruption.

While many 'tigers' (i.e., high-ranking officials) have been detained and prosecuted for crimes since the beginning of Xi Jinping and Wang Qishan's anti corruption drive in 2013, Rui is arguably one of the most high-profile non-political personalities implicated in the anti-corruption campaign. Rui's longtime patron Guo Zhenxi, the head of CCTV's financial news channel, was earlier detained for allegedly accepting bribes, and Guo was part of the faction of former security chief Zhou Yongkang who was considered the biggest "tiger".

Rui is reportedly scheduled for release from prison on December 11, 2020, according to a tweet by the Zhimian news service quoting court documents.

See also
Ye Yingchun

References

1977 births
Living people
Chinese television presenters
People from Hefei
People's Republic of China journalists
CCTV newsreaders and journalists